Loesenera is a genus of plants in the family Fabaceae.

Species accepted by the Plants of the World Online as of February 2021:
Loesenera gabonensis 
Loesenera kalantha 
Loesenera talbotii 
Loesenera walkeri

References

Detarioideae
Fabaceae genera
Taxonomy articles created by Polbot